Mud Island Shoal is a small island in the Delaware River in Bensalem Township in Bucks County, Pennsylvania, just before the confluence with Rancocas Creek.

River islands of Pennsylvania
Islands of the Delaware River
Landforms of Bucks County, Pennsylvania